General elections were held in the Cook Islands on 13 October 1958, the first under universal suffrage.

Background
Following the recommendations of the 1955 Belshaw-Stace Report, the 23-member Legislative Council was replaced by a 27-member Legislative Assembly.

Of the 27 members, 15 were directly elected; 14 from ten general constituencies and one from a European voter constituency. Seven members were indirectly elected by Island Councils (four from Rarotonga and one from Aitutaki, Atiu and Mangaia). The remaining five members were officials, including the Resident Commissioner as President of the Assembly, the Administration Secretary, the Treasurer and two members appointed by the Resident Commissioner.

Campaign
A total of 65 candidates contested the directly elected seats, including former Legislative Council member Willie Watson, who ran under the name Viri Vokotini in one of the general constituencies.

Frank Bateson and former Chief Judge Alfred McCarthy contested the European seat.

Results

References

Cook Islands
Elections in the Cook Islands
1958 in the Cook Islands
October 1958 events in Oceania